Jason Jung and Dennis Novikov were the defending champions but only Novikov chose to defend his title, partnering Julio Peralta. Novikov lost in the semifinals to Austin Krajicek and Jackson Withrow.

Krajicek and Withrow won the title after defeating Bradley Klahn and Tennys Sandgren 6–4, 6–3 in the final.

Seeds

Draw

References
 Main Draw
 Qualifying Draw

Tennis Championships of Maui - Doubles